Ayisha Fuseini  is a Ghanaian social entrepreneur. Fuseini is the founder and CEO of a company called Asheba Enterprise, registered in 2013 in Ghana, working with over 600 women in rural communities in Tamale; Northern region. She established a processing center that reduces the workload of the women she works with. Her enterprise also provides financial services to support women in the Shea business. Her company produces beauty products such as soap, body creams and other products using high quality shea butter. She is also a supplier of shea butter to The Body Shop chain.

Personal life 
Ayisha is a divorced mother of three.

Education 
She holds a Diploma in Business Administration and was recognized as an Investment business programmer by  Invest in Africa's (IIA) Business Linkage Programme (BLP) in 2016.

Awards 
She won two Invest in Africa awards in January 2018: Female Entrepreneur of the Year (2018) and Business Innovation of the Year.

References 

Social entrepreneurs
Living people
21st-century Ghanaian businesswomen
21st-century Ghanaian businesspeople
Ghanaian chief executives
Year of birth missing (living people)